Fact and Fiction is a studio album released by English neo-progressive band Twelfth Night in 1982.

Details
Recorded during down-time at Revolution Studios, Cheadle Hulme, Fact and Fiction was engineered by Stuart Rickering, Johnny Gluck, and Pablo, and produced by Twelfth Night and Andy MacPherson. Tape effects remixed at Twilight Studios, Salford, England, with engineer Frank Walsh.

Originally to be released on the REVO label (like the "Eleanor Rigby" single), but while Revolution was financing it the band did not feel they were getting the artistic control they would have liked, so they bought the tapes themselves, throwing their financial position into chaos.

The first pressing, of 1000 LPs, sold out in 4 weeks.

When French label MSI Distribution wanted to re-issue Fact and Fiction on CD, they did talk to drummer and archivist Brian Devoil about it, but, as was the case with their Live at the Target re-issue, released it before a formal contract was made and signed.

The songs "We Are Sane" and "Creepshow" from this release are included on the compilation album Collector's Item.

The official CD was released in August 2002 with seven bonus tracks and again in June 2018 with 31 bonus tracks.

Track listing
All songs written by Twelfth Night except "Eleanor Rigby" by Lennon-McCartney.
"We Are Sane" (a. Te Dium; b. We Are Sane; c. Dictator's Excuse Me) (10:27)
"Human Being" (7:50)
"This City" (4:01)
"World Without End" (1:54)
"Fact and Fiction" (3:59)
"The Poet Sniffs a Flower" (3:51)
"Creepshow" (11:57)
"Love Song" (5:38)

First reissue
As above, with seven bonus tracks:
"East of Eden" (3:27, single a-side)
"Eleanor Rigby" (3:22, single b-side)
"Constant (Fact and Fiction)" (2:27, demo, Spring 1982)
"Fistful of Bubbles" (3:18, demo, Spring 1982)
"Leader" (2:40, demo, Spring 1982)
"Dancing in the Dream" (2:58, demo, Spring 1982)
"Human Being" (3:56, session outtake - alternate version)

Second reissue, 2018 Definitive Edition
Disc 1, original studio album with 4 bonus tracks:
"Being Human" (3:56, session outtake - alternate version)
"Paradise Locked" (1:23) - previously unreleased
"East of Eden" (3:27, single a-side)
"Eleanor Rigby" (3:22, single b-side)
Disc 2, live 1983-2012 + demos
We Are Sane (12.49) - live 1983 - previously unreleased
Human Being (7.56) - live 1984
This City (3.59) - live 2010
World Without End (1.26) - live 2012 - previously unreleased
Fact and Fiction (5:53) - live 1983 - previously unreleased
The Poet Sniffs a Flower (3.42) - live 1983 - previously unreleased
Creepshow (13:33) - live 2012 - previously unreleased
Love Song (6:26) - live 1983
Fact and Fiction (4:44) - live 2012 - previously unreleased
Constant [Fact and Fiction] (2:27) - demo
Fistful of Bubbles (3:18) - demo
Leader (2:41) - demo
Dancing in the Dream (2:59) - demo
Creepshow (closing section) (3.50) - demo - previously unreleased
Disc 3, covers and interpretations

DEAN BAKER - Electro Sane (1:25)
MARK SPENCER - We Are Sane (11:01) - new recording, previously unreleased
PENDRAGON - Human Being (6:05)
TIM BOWNESS - This City (4:35) - new recording, previously unreleased
COBURG - This City (5:26) - new recording, previously unreleased
CLIVE NOLAN - World Without End (2.23) - new recording, previously unreleased
GALAHAD - Fact and Fiction (5:17) - new recording, previously unreleased
MARK SPENCER ft. LEE ABRAHAM - The Poet Sniffs a Flower (3:48) - new recording, previously unreleased
TWELFTH NIGHT - Creepyshow (11:49)
ALAN REED & KIM SEVIOUR - Love Song (6:04)
AXE - Don’t Make Me Laugh (3:46)
EH! GEOFF MANN BAND - Fact and Fiction (4:21)
EH! GEOFF MANN BAND - Love Song (7:02)

Other contemporary tracks
 An early version of "Human Being", recorded 16 March 1982 during the same sessions as "Constant (Fact and Fiction)", "Fistful of Bubbles", "Leader" and "Dancing in the Dream", is available on Voices in the Night.
 Three tracks recorded by the band in July 1983 as demos for CBS have been released; two on Collector's Item ("The Ceiling Speaks" and "Deep in the Heartland") and one on Voices in the Night (another version of "Fact and Fiction").

Personnel
Brian Devoil - drums, percussion
Geoff Mann - vocals, tape effects
Clive Mitten - bass, keyboards, classical guitar
Andy Revell - electric and acoustic guitar
with: 
Jane Mann - additional vocals on "World Without End" and "Fact and Fiction"

References

1982 albums
Twelfth Night (band) albums